Rączka is a Polish surname. Notable people with the surname include:

Damian Rączka (born 1987), Polish footballer
Mike Raczka (born 1962), American baseball player

See also

Polish-language surnames